Thới Lai may refer to several places in Vietnam:

Thới Lai District, a rural district of Cần Thơ
Thới Lai (township), a township and capital of Thới Lai District
Thới Lai, Bến Tre, a commune of Bình Đại District